The AGM-1 is a bullpup, semi-automatic carbine produced in Italy.  The carbine is readily convertible from 9×19mm Parabellum to .45 ACP as well as .22 Long Rifle.  It features a set trigger and a heavy, target-type barrel.  The magazines for the 9×19mm Parabellum variant are interchangeable with the Browning Hi-Power pistol.

See also
List of bullpup firearms
List of carbines

References

External links
 Photographs
 Algimech AGM-1: A Short-Lived Italian 9mm Bullpup

Rifles of Italy
Bullpup rifles
.22 LR semi-automatic rifles